Millburn Academy (Gaelic: Acadamaidh Allt a' Mhuilinn) is a six-year secondary school in Inverness, Scotland. It serves the portion of Inverness east of the River Ness along with rural areas to the south of the city's reach, with a catchment area that includes the primary schools of Crown, Daviot, Drakies, Inshes, Raigmore and Strathdearn. The school runs parallel to the 'Mill Burn' which was originally used for a Whisky distillery. The distillery is now gone and has been replaced by a chain hotel. 

Millburn Academy opened for pupils in August 1961, although at that time it was known as Millburn Junior
Secondary School.
In its early years Millburn Junior Secondary School catered for pupils in the first three, and later four, years of
secondary, but in 1967 the school name was changed to Millburn Secondary School, showing the direction in which
the school was developing.
For a period after 1967, the introduction of comprehensive education meant that Millburn Academy accommodated
all pupils on the east side of Inverness for the first 2 years of their secondary education, after which the more able
transferred to Inverness Royal Academy to continue their education while the others remained at Millburn
Secondary School.
In 1967 the school was renamed as Millburn High School for a short time, but after pressure from parents it was
re-designated as Millburn Academy.
The arrangement with Inverness Royal Academy ended in 1977 and from 1979 Millburn Academy could
concentrate on being the sixth year secondary school for the catchment area - Crown, Drakies, Milton Of Leys, Raigmore, Moy,
Daviot and Raigbeg Primary Schools, including pupils living in the area who attended Bishop Eden Primary School
and St. Josephs R.C. Primary School. Through the 1980s the school developed into a six year secondary.
The current at Millburn academy is Johnny Croal ( elected in 2019).

School badge 
The school badge was designed by the former head of Art and Design at the school, the late James Cameron. It consists of:

 A torch: the symbol of learning;
 A mill wheel and water which operated on the Mill Burn;
 An eagle, the symbol of St John and the school motto, "Strive to Achieve".

School building 

The original school building and school huts were replaced by the new school building in 2007. The new school was built through the Public Private Partnership Agreement for £26,000,000. The building consists of 3 floors. The ground floor is made up of the support for learning, guidance, physical education and technical departments as well as a large social area. There is also a canteen on the ground floor which serves hot and cold meals daily. A notable feature is the huge sports hall which is situated in the centre of the building. The first floor is made up of the business, history, geography, modern studies, religious education, mathematics, music and science departments. The spiral staircase in the main foyer leads up to another social area. The second and top floor is made up of the English, modern languages and art departments.

The school also has a large grass playing field and a fourth generation astroturf multi-purpose pitch. The car parking facilities are available both adjacent to Diriebught Road and Victoria drive.

Rectors 

 John Mathieson MA FRSGS 1961 - 1972
 William T Weatherspoon BSc Dip Ed 1972 - 1989
 GC Spence MA 1990 - 2007
 Delia Thornton MA 2007- 2011
 Gavin MacLean 2011–2018
 Johnny Croall 2018–present

References

External links 

 
 profile on Parentzone at Education Scotland

Secondary schools in Inverness
1961 establishments in Scotland
Educational institutions established in 1961